Elias Valderhaug (born 26 April 1990) is a Norwegian footballer who plays as a goalkeeper for Åkra in 3. divisjon. He has previously played for Molde in Tippeligaen, and has also had spells with Start and Kongsvinger.

Career
Valderhaug was born in Valderøy and played for IL Valder and Åkra IL before joining Molde in 2007. He made his debut on the first-team, when he replaced Knut Dørum Lillebakk in the 87th minute in the quarter-final of the 2009 Norwegian Football Cup against Rosenborg on 9 August 2009. Valderhaug was sent on loan together with his team-mate Jacob Meidell to the nabour club Kristiansund BK in August 2012, where he played nine matches in the Second Division. Valderhaug made his debut in Tippeligaen against Sarpsborg 08 on 20 November 2011, after Ole Gunnar Solskjær decided to let him play the last two games of the season instead of Espen Bugge Pettersen, since Molde already had won Tippeligaen that year.

Valderhaug joined Start on a short-term loan-deal on 12 April 2012, due to injuries on both their goalkeepers, Alexander Lund Hansen and Johnny Kristiansen. Valderhaug played Start's match against HamKam three days later, but returned to Molde in the middle of June even though the loan lasted to 1 August as both Start's goalkeeper had returned from their injuries.

Valderhaug joined Kongsvinger in August 2012 on a short-term contract to the end of the 2012 season, and played 12 matches for the team in the First Division. After seeing out his short-term contract, Valderhaug moved back to his home-county Møre og Romsdal and signed a two-year contract with the newly promoted First Division side Kristiansund BK.

Club statistics

References

1990 births
Living people
Sportspeople from Møre og Romsdal
Norwegian footballers
Association football goalkeepers
Molde FK players
Kristiansund BK players
IK Start players
Kongsvinger IL Toppfotball players
Eliteserien players
Norwegian First Division players
Norwegian Third Division players
People from Giske